Dudarsi  is a village in Neemuch district of Madhya Pradesh state of India.

References

Villages in Neemuch district